Yamil Alberto Peralta Jara (born 16 July 1991 in Tres de Febrero, Buenos Aires Province) is an Argentinian boxer who won Heavyweight Bronze at the PanAm Games 2011 and later qualified for the Olympics.

Career
At the 2010 South American Games, Peralta competed at light heavyweight.  He reached the semifinals, where he was defeated by Carlos Gongora, therefore winning the bronze medal.  After these Games, he moved up to the heavyweight division.

At the 2011 Pan American Games he lost the heavyweight semifinal to eventual champion Lenier Pero 9:13.  At the 2011 World Amateur Boxing Championships he lost his first bout to Canadian Samir El Mais, whom he beat 15:12 at the Olympic qualifier in a rematch.  This result was enough ensure his qualification for the 2012 Olympics although he lost the final to Michael Hunter 10:12.

At the Boxing at the 2012 Summer Olympics – Men's heavyweight he defeated Chouaib Bouloudinat but lost to Tervel Pulev 10:13.

At the 2013 World Championships, he won a bronze medal.

In 2014 he turned professional.

In 2022, Yamil remained undefeated at 13-0 until he fought Canadian Ryan Rozicki (15-1) on 7 May for the WBC International Cruiserweight title in Sydney Nova Scotia, Canada.  In a statement made by Rozicki’s promoter Dan Otter, the rematch has been scheduled for the fall of 2022.

Professional boxing record

Notes

References

External links
 
 
 
 
 
 

1991 births
Living people
Argentine male boxers
Heavyweight boxers
Olympic boxers of Argentina
Boxers at the 2012 Summer Olympics
Boxers at the 2016 Summer Olympics
AIBA World Boxing Championships medalists
Pan American Games bronze medalists for Argentina
Pan American Games medalists in boxing
Boxers at the 2011 Pan American Games
Medalists at the 2011 Pan American Games
South American Games gold medalists for Argentina
South American Games bronze medalists for Argentina
South American Games medalists in boxing
Competitors at the 2010 South American Games
Competitors at the 2014 South American Games
People from Tres de Febrero Partido
Sportspeople from Buenos Aires Province